Zhuang Rongwen (born February 1961) is a Chinese politician, currently serving as director of the Cyberspace Administration of China, director of the Office of the Central Cyber Security and Informatization Commission, deputy director of the State Council Information Office, and deputy head of the Publicity Department of the Chinese Communist Party.

He is a representative of the 20th National Congress of the Chinese Communist Party and a member of the 20th Central Committee of the Chinese Communist Party.

Early life and education
Zhuang was born in Quanzhou, Fujian, in February 1961, and graduated from Hohai University.

Political career
Zhuang joined the Chinese Communist Party (CCP) in June 1987. He assumed various administrative and political roles in Fujian before being transferred to the central government in 2010.

He was director of the Department of Economy, Science and Technology of the Overseas Chinese Affairs Office of the State Council in December 2010 and subsequently deputy director of the office in June 2014. In August 2015, he was appointed deputy director of the Cyberspace Administration of China. He was chosen as director of the State Internet Information Office in August 2018. He also serves as director of the Office of the Central Cyber Security and Informatization Commission and deputy director of the State Council Information Office.

References

1961 births
Living people
People from Quanzhou
Hohai University alumni
People's Republic of China politicians from Fujian
Chinese Communist Party politicians from Fujian
Members of the 20th Central Committee of the Chinese Communist Party